Florence Goulet (born 30 June 1961) is a French journalist and politician of the National Rally. Since 2022, she has represented Meuse's 2nd constituency in the National Assembly.

Biography

Goulet was born and raised in Orne. She is the daughter of former deputy and senator Daniel Goulet who represented the department's constituency. Goulet trained as a journalist and reporter focusing on rural affairs before entering politics. She has also been a member of the French Alzheimer association. Her husband is MEP André Rougé.

Goulet was an activist for Rally for the Republic and its successor Union for a Popular Movement. She also worked as a parliamentary attaché for Henri Guaino and was a substitute for Philippe Senau, The Republicans candidate for the senatorial elections in Orne in 2017. She joined the National Rally in 2021 and worked as a campaign coordinator for Marine Le Pen. In 2022, she was elected to Meuse's 2nd constituency during the legislative elections held that year.

References

1961 births
Living people
National Rally (France) politicians
Deputies of the 16th National Assembly of the French Fifth Republic
French women journalists
Women members of the National Assembly (France)
21st-century French women politicians
Politicians from Normandy
People from Orne